Chatroom is a 2010 British psychological thriller drama film directed by Hideo Nakata from a screenplay by Enda Walsh, based on Walsh's 2005 play of the same name. The film follows five teenagers who meet on an online chatroom and encourage each other's bad behaviour.

Plot
William Collins is a depressed teenage boy recovering from self-harm and regularly goes online to chatrooms. One day, he decides to open a chatroom himself and calls it "Chelsea Teens!", where he meets Jim, Eva, Emily and Mo. There is no real subject matter in "Chelsea Teens!", which instead focuses on the lives of each one as they talk. Even though they only really communicate through text, they are depicted in an old hotel-like room and actually having contact.

William is a loner who lives with his parents. He hates both his parents, blaming them for his past, and lives his entire life on the Internet. Jim is another loner who is suffering from depression following his father leaving him and his mother. Eva, a model, is constantly bullied by her co-workers for her appearance. Emily feels distant from her parents and does not feel like she receives enough attention. Mo believes himself to be a pedophile because he is attracted to his friend Si's prepubescent sister, Keisha. William sees it to himself to help them in a crude manner. He Photoshops embarrassing pictures of Eva's co-worker and posts them online. He convinces Jim to flush down his antidepressants to make himself feel more relaxed and to reveal his face behind the depressants, his true identity. He tells Emily to do some dirty work, teaming up with Eva. They devise ways in which Emily could be more violent and make it look like somebody is harassing her family, which makes her parents try to protect her more. He tells Mo to tell Si the truth, but this backfires when Si calls him a pervert and attacks him.

William becomes darker and more menacing and even begins to watch people commit suicide. He then takes it upon himself to coerce Jim into committing suicide. His plans are halted though when his computer and phone are taken away from him by his father, who when looking through William's computer, finds one of the suicide videos. William gets his backup computer and phone and goes after Jim, who meets up with him at London Zoo. Mo and the others discover about William's intended actions and go to stop him, meeting up in person and trying to follow William and Jim around London.

Jim makes it to the zoo first but decides to not do it. He tries to leave, but William chases him. William catches Jim, who refuses to shoot himself and throws the gun to the floor. When William gets it and comes back, Eva punches him and the rest of the crew comes, followed by the police. William tries to escape but only manages to climb up some crates. He then falls in front of the speeding train behind the crates and is killed. The teens leave without talking to each other; William's account is shut down. William walks in a chat tunnel as the light gradually fades.

Cast

Production
Principal photography took place in early 2010 at Shepperton Studios in Shepperton, Surrey, with some outdoor scenes shot in Camden and Primrose Hill. The film is based on a screenplay by Enda Walsh, who wrote the stage play of the same name.

Release
The film premiered in the Un Certain Regard section of the 2010 Cannes Film Festival. The theatrical release was in late 2010. It premiered in France in late summer 2010. In September 2010, the film acquired a British distributor. Revolver Entertainment also planned a special online marketing campaign for the film.

Critical reception
Chatroom received largely negative reviews.

References

External links
 
 
 

2010 films
2010 independent films
2010 psychological thriller films
2010 thriller drama films
2010s British films
2010s English-language films
2010s psychological drama films
2010s teen drama films
British films based on plays
British independent films
British psychological drama films
British psychological thriller films
British teen drama films
British thriller drama films
Films about cyberbullying
Films about depression
Films about social media
Films about suicide
Films directed by Hideo Nakata
Films produced by Alison Owen
Films scored by Kenji Kawai
Films set in London
Films shot at Shepperton Studios
Films shot in London
Teen thriller films